Prebiotic may refer to:

 Prebiotic (chemistry), inorganic or organic chemistry in the natural environment before the advent of life on Earth
 Prebiotic (nutrition), non-digestible food ingredients

See also
 Probiotic, live microorganisms claimed provide health benefits when consumed